Arizona elegans philipi, commonly known as the Painted Desert glossy snake,  is a subspecies of glossy snakes, a nonvenomous colubrid endemic to North America.

Etymology
The epithet philipipi is in honor of Philip Monroe Klauber, son of herpetologist Laurence Monroe Klauber who named the subspecies.

Geographic range
It is found in the south-western United States, from the far western tip of Texas, through New Mexico, and into Arizona, as well as into northern Mexico. Its range overlaps that of other glossy snake subspecies, and interbreeding is likely. Thus, distinguishing subspecies which share range is often difficult.

Description
The Painted Desert glossy snake is typically a light tan brown in color, with darker brown blotches down the length of the back. This subspecies usually has around 60 blotches, which is a greater number than in other subspecies. Each blotch is usually edged with black. The underside is usually solid cream or white in color. The coloration can vary, lighter or darker, depending on the soil and elevation of the localized habitat, with specimens from higher elevations often being darker in color. Adults can be from 20 to 35 inches (50 to 90 cm) in total length. They have a thin body, with smooth dorsal scales, and the pupil of the eye is round.

In females of Arizona elegans philipi the length of the tail is greater than 13.5% of the total body length; in males, greater than 14.5%. In most specimens the smooth dorsal scales are arranged in 27 rows at midbody.

Habitat
Their preferred habitat is sandy and rocky arid regions, it is often found in areas of lightly vegetated with creosote bush and sagebrush.

Diet
Their diet consists of lizards, and small rodents. They are nocturnal, and can often be found foraging in roadside ditches in the late evening.

Reproduction
Mating occurs in spring, and the female lays a clutch of up to 24 eggs which hatch in the fall. Hatchlings are 9-11 inches (23–28 cm) in total length.

References

Further reading
 Klauber, L.M. 1946. The Glossy Snake, Arizona, with Descriptions of New Subspecies. Trans. San Diego Soc. Nat. Hist. 10 (17): 311–398, map, 2 plates. ("Arizona elegans philipi subsp. nov.", pp. 333–340.)

External links

Herps of Texas: Arizona elegans 

Colubrids
Reptiles of Mexico
Reptiles of the United States
Fauna of the Southwestern United States
Reptiles described in 1946
Taxa named by Laurence Monroe Klauber